Nemotragus is a monotypic beetle genus in the family Cerambycidae described by Félix Édouard Guérin-Méneville in 1844. Its only species, Nemotragus helvolus, was described by the same author in the same year.

References

Agapanthiini
Beetles described in 1844
Monotypic beetle genera